The Tri-Center Community School District is a rural public school district headquartered in Neola, Iowa.

The district spans northern Pottawattamie County and southern Harrison County.  It serves Neola, Minden, Persia, and the surrounding rural areas, including Beebeetown.

The school mascot is the Trojans and the colors are black and gold.

Schools
The district operates three schools, all in Neola: 
Tri-Center Elementary School
Tri-Center Middle School
Tri-Center High School

See also
List of school districts in Iowa

References

External links
 Tri-Center Community School District
School districts in Iowa
Education in Harrison County, Iowa
Education in Pottawattamie County, Iowa